Rifat Rinatovich Mustafin (born 12 August 1983) is a former Russian professional football player.

Club career
He played two seasons in the Russian Football National League for FC KAMAZ Naberezhnye Chelny.

References

External links
 

1983 births
People from Naberezhnye Chelny
Living people
Russian footballers
Association football midfielders
FC Neftekhimik Nizhnekamsk players
FC KAMAZ Naberezhnye Chelny players
Sportspeople from Tatarstan